Abbreviations Guide
(Ind.) - Independent
Minor Parties:
(AAEVP) Animal Alliance Environment Voters Party of Canada
(CAP) - Canadian Action Party
(CHP) - Christian Heritage Party
(Comm.) - Communist Party
(FPNP) - First Peoples National Party of Canada
(Libert.) - Libertarian Party
(Mar.) - Marijuana Party
(M-L) - Marxist–Leninist Party
(PC) - Progressive Canadian Party
(WBP) - Western Block Party
Note that names in boldface type represent either Cabinet members or opposition party leaders.
Names are as registered with Elections Canada

Newfoundland and Labrador

Prince Edward Island

Nova Scotia

New Brunswick

Quebec

Eastern Quebec

Côte-Nord and Saguenay

Quebec City

Central Quebec

Eastern Townships

Montérégie

Eastern Montreal

Western Montreal

Northern Montreal and Laval

Laurentides, Outaouais and Northern Quebec

Ontario

Ottawa

Eastern Ontario

Central Ontario

Southern Durham and York

Suburban Toronto

Central Toronto

Brampton, Mississauga and Oakville

Hamilton, Burlington and Niagara

Midwestern Ontario

Southwestern Ontario

Northern Ontario

Manitoba

Rural Manitoba

Winnipeg

Saskatchewan

Southern Saskatchewan

Northern Saskatchewan

Alberta

Rural Alberta

Edmonton and environs

Calgary

British Columbia

BC Interior

Fraser Valley and Southern Lower Mainland

Vancouver and Northern Lower Mainland

Vancouver Island

Nunavut

Northwest Territories

Yukon

References

External links
Election Almanac - Canada Federal Election
Nomination Watch

2006 Canadian federal election